Tynes Hildebrand is a former American basketball coach and athletic director. Hildebrand was the head basketball coach at Northwestern State University from 1965 to 1980, compiling an overall record of 187–203. He later served as athletic director for Northwestern State from 1983 to 1996. Hildebrand was elected to the Louisiana Sports Hall of Fame in 2014.

Head coaching record

References

Living people
Basketball coaches from Louisiana
College men's track and field athletes in the United States

High school basketball coaches in the United States
Basketball players from Louisiana
Northwestern State Demons basketball coaches
Northwestern State Demons basketball players
Northwestern State Demons and Lady Demons athletic directors
Year of birth uncertain
American men's basketball players
Year of birth missing (living people)